Marron is a name given to two closely related species of crayfish in Western Australia.

Marron may also refer to:
 Marron (surname), a Spanish surname (including a list of people with the name)
 Marron, a character in Dragon Ball manga series
 Marron Curtis Fort (1938–2019), American-born German linguist and professor
 Marron, chestnut fruit
 Marron glacé, a candied chestnut 
 Marron River, British Columbia, Canada
 River Marron, Cumbria, England, United Kingdom
 Le Marron, a former restaurant in Malden, Netherlands

See also

 Maron (disambiguation)
 Maroon (disambiguation)

French unisex given names